Westmill is a residential area of Hitchin in Hertfordshire, England. It was originally built as a council housing estate in the 1920s. There is a primary school, Oughton Junior, Infant and Nursery School. It forms part of Oughton ward for local government purposes.

It is close to the Oughtonhead Common, a Local Nature Reserve, and Oughtonhead Lane, a geological Site of Special Scientific Interest.

References

Areas of Hitchin